Suck This is the second live album by the American punk rock band the Queers, released in 1995 by independent record label Clearview Records. It was recorded live in the studio at the Jam Room in Columbia, South Carolina and released as a single-sided picture disc, and reissued on compact disc in 1998. It was the band's only live album recorded during the period when Screeching Weasel members Dan Vapid and Dan Panic were also in the Queers.

Reception
Reviewing the album for AllMusic, critic Mike DaRonco rated it 4 stars out of 5 and said that in comparison to the band's previous live album, Shout at the Queers (1994), "the production is a lot tighter, the lineup features Danny Panic and Danny Vapid from Screeching Weasel fame and the songs blast from one track to the next without a breather (excluding 'Beer Break', which only lasts for a few seconds anyway). This is the definitive Queers live album that does them justice." In an overview of the band written for Trouser Press, Ira Robbins said that both live albums "capture the breathless rush of a Queers set with enthusiastic abandon."

Track listing
Writing credits adapted from the liner notes of the band's other albums.

Personnel
Credits adapted from the album's liner notes.
 Joe Queer (Joe King) – lead vocals, guitar
 Dan Vapid (Dan Schafer) – guitar, backing vocals
 B-Face (Chris Barnard) – bass guitar, backing vocals, artwork
 Dan Panic (Dan Sullivan) – drums

References

The Queers albums
1995 live albums